Tunjice Hills seahorse can refer to any of the two fossil species of seahorse found in the Early Miocene-aged marine strata in the Tunjice Hills area of Western Slovenia:

 Hippocampus sarmaticus
 Hippocampus slovenicus